Two warships of the Imperial Japanese Navy were named Tatsuta:

 , a cruiser launched in 1894 and scrapped in 1926
 , a  launched in 1918 and sunk in 1944

Imperial Japanese Navy ship names
Japanese Navy ship names